Whisper in Your Ear is an album by The Whispers released in 1979 on the SOLAR Records label. This album peaked at number 28 on the Billboard Soul Albums chart.

Track listing

Credits
 A&R [A&R Coordination] – Marge Meoli
 Arranged By [Vocal] – Nicholas Caldwell
 Bass – Melvin Coleman (2), Otis Stokes, Wilton Felder
 Cello – Juliana Buffum*, Miguel Martinez*, Nils Oliver
 Concertmaster, Violin – Janice Gower
 Design [Album] – Gribbitt!, Tim Bryant (2)
 Drums – Ed Greene (2), Fred Alexander Jr., James Gadson
 Engineer [Mixing] – Kerry McNabb
 Engineer [Recording], Engineer [Mixing] – Steve Hodge
 Guitar – David T. Walker, Earnest Reed, Wah Wah Watson*, Paul Jackson Jr., Ricky Sylvers, Stephen Shockley
 Keyboards – Greg Phillinganes, Joey Gallo, Kenney Hirsh*, Norman Beavers, Sonny Burke (2)
 Mastered By – Wally Traugott
 Percussion – Fred Lewis (2), Paulinho Da Costa
 Photography By – Ron Slenzak
 Producer – Dick Griffey, The Whispers
 Producer [Special Assistant] – Kossi Gardner, Lakeside
 Producer [Special Assistant], Bass – Leon Sylvers
 Saxophone – Don Myrick, Fred Jackson Jr.*, Edward Lewis*
 Trombone – George Bohanon, Kraig Kilby, Louis Satterfield, Maurice Spears
 Trumpet – Robert O. Bryant*, John Parrish, Michael Harris, Nolan Smith Jr.*, Michael Davis*
 Viola – Marilyn H. Baker*, Rollice E. Dale*
 Violin – David Montagu, Gina Kronstadt, Haim Shtrum, Harris Goldman, Henry L. Roth*, Jack Gootkin, Jerome J. Reisler*, Joseph Goodman, Joseph Stepansky, William H. Henderson*

Charts

Singles

References

External links
 The Whispers-Whisper In Your Ear at Discogs

1979 albums
SOLAR Records albums
The Whispers albums